The Statfjord oil field is a large oil and gas field covering 580 km2 in the U.K.-Norwegian boundary of the North Sea at a water depth of 145 m, discovered in 1974 by Mobil and since 1987 operated by Equinor.

It is a trans-median field crossing the Norwegian and UK North Sea Boundary with approximately 15% being in the UK Continental Shelf waters. Oil is loaded offshore and taken directly to refineries; gas is transported via the Statpipe pipeline to mainland Norway.

Geology
The field is located in the northern part of the Viking Graben, north of the Viking Trough and east of the East Shetland Platform, in the same general area as the Brent oilfield discovered in 1971, and the Cormorant oilfield, Thistle oil field, Dunlin oilfield, Heather oil field and the Hutton oilfield, all discovered by 1973.  A regional grid of reflection seismology lines showed the Brent structural trend extended into the area forming a "large northeast-trending and northwesterly tilted" (at 6-8 degrees) Fault block, partly eroded on the east flank, with Jurassic and Cretaceous shales trapping any oil in the Middle Jurassic Brent deltaic and Late Triassic-Early Jurassic Statfjord fluvial sandstones originating from the Kimmeridge Clay Formation.  The field is on the same structural trend but separated from the Brent Field, 20 km to the southwest, by normal faulting and a structural saddle.

A Conoco 211/24-1 well drilled in 1972-1973 on the U.K. side of the structure turned out to be downdip to the Oil-water contact and it wasn't until the April 1974 Mobil well 33/12-1, on the Norwegian side, that oil was discovered in 160 m of Brent Formation.  A second well "established an oil-water contact at 2584 m subsea" and a third well discovered a 127 m oil column in the Statfjord Formation with an oil-water contact 2806 m subsea.

Production

The Statfjord field has three condeep concrete production platforms, A, B and C Each platform is made up of approximately 250,000 tonnes of concrete with 40,000 tonnes of top-side processing and accommodation facilities.

Statfjord holds the record for the highest daily production ever recorded for a European oil field (outside Russia) :  (crude oil plus natural gas liquids) were produced on January 16, 1987.

Statjord holds one more record - the  biggest single contract in Norwegian history for construction of Statfjord B platform 
 
As a mainly natural gas producer, Statfjord is scheduled to remain active until 2032.

Statfjord oil spill
In December 2007, thousands of tonnes of oil were spilled into the North Sea during the loading of a tanker at the Statfjord oil field. The spill, estimated at 21,750 barrels (approx 3,000 metric tons), was the country's second largest ever, according to Norway's oil safety authority. The accident happened in rough weather while the tanker Navion Britannica was loading oil from a storage buoy, according to the operator Equinor.

See also

List of oil and gas fields of the North Sea
List of oil spills

References

External links

 The Statfjord area
 Statfjord A approaches journey's end
 Statfjord in Aftenbladet Energi Interactive Energy Map

Equinor oil and gas fields
Natural gas fields in Norway
North Sea oil fields
Oil fields in Norway
1979 establishments in Norway